The Remission of Penalties Act 1859 (22 Vict c 32) is an Act of the Parliament of the United Kingdom. It allows the Crown to remit penalties for offences that are payable to parties other than the Crown.

This Act was repealed for the Republic of Ireland by section 26 of, and the  Second Schedule to, the Criminal Justice Act, 1951.

Preamble
The preamble was repealed by the Statute Law Revision Act 1892.

Section 1 - Penalties for offences may be remitted by the Crown although payable to parties other than the Crown

The words "or in Ireland for the Lord Lieutenant or other Chief Governor or Governors of Ireland" were repealed by the Statute Law Revision Act 1892 and by article 14(2) of, and Schedule 6 to, the Northern Ireland (Modification of Enactments-No 1) Order 1973 (S.I. 1973/2163).

See Todd v Robinson (1884) 14 QBD 739, (1884) 54 LJQB 47, CA.

"Payable to some party other than the Crown"

This formerly included a penalty payable to a common informer. Such penalties were abolished by section 1 of the Common Informers Act 1951.

See also
Halsbury's Statutes

References

External links
The Remission of Penalties Act 1859, as amended from the National Archives.
The Remission of Penalties Act 1859, as originally enacted from the National Archives.

United Kingdom Acts of Parliament 1859